The 43rd Grand Bell Awards ceremony was held at the COEX Convention Hall in Seoul on July 21, 2006.

Nominations and winners 
(Winners denoted in bold)

References

External links 
 

Grand Bell Awards
Grand Bell Awards
Grand Bell Awards